Missionary Baptists  are a group of Baptists that grew out of the missionary / anti-missionary controversy that divided Baptists in the United States in the early part of the 19th century, with Missionary Baptists following the pro-missions movement position. Those who opposed the innovations became known as anti-missions or Primitive Baptists. Since arising in the 19th century, the influence of Primitive Baptists waned as "Missionary Baptists became the mainstream". Missionary Baptist, unlike the common thought, are not their own denomination. This is clear, as many have Southern Baptist Logos on their sign.

Missionary Baptist is also a term used by adherents of many African American Baptist churches and Landmark Baptist churches belonging to the American Baptist Association, the Baptist Missionary Association of America and the Interstate and Foreign Landmark Missionary Baptist Association.

References

Further reading
 Bertram Wyatt-Brown. "The Antimission Movement in the Jacksonian South: A Study in Regional Folk Culture," Journal of Southern History Vol. 36, No. 4 (Nov., 1970), pp. 501–529 in JSTOR

Arminian denominations
Baptist denominations in North America